Felka Platek   (Felka Płatek; 3 November 1899 – 2 August 1944) was a Polish artist.

Biography 
Platek  was born on 3 November 1899 in Warsaw, Poland.  She was the companion and later the wife of the German painter Felix Nussbaum.

The couple fled Germany around 1935. They lived in Paris, then Ostend, settling in Brussels where they married in 1937.  Nussbaum and Platek were arrested by the Germans in 1944. They were sent to the Auschwitz concentration camp

Platek was murdered, probably on or about 2 August 1944 at Auschwitz.

Legacy
In 2014 the International Auschwitz Committee sponsored a program entitled "Find Felka! Find Felix!". The Felix Nussbaum Haus in Osnabrück includes a permanent display of Platek's work. "

Gallery

References

External links

 Find Felka Find Felix website

1899 births
1944 deaths
People from Warsaw
20th-century Polish women artists
Polish Jews who died in the Holocaust
Polish people who died in Auschwitz concentration camp